Leslie Dale Martin (April 24, 1967 – May 10, 2002) was an American criminal. He was convicted and later executed by the state of Louisiana for the rape and murder of Christina Burgin.

Crime 
 
About 1:30 a.m. the next morning, after Roland and most of the victim's friends had left the lounge, the victim asked Martin for a ride home, and Martin agreed. No one ever saw the victim alive again.

About 7:30 a.m., Martin visited Leo Guimbellot, his carpentry supervisor on a recent job, and stated he had met a blonde college student the night before, left the lounge with her and woke up on Galveston Beach not knowing where he was. Martin's clothes were dirty, and he pointed to vomit in his ashtray, stating, "I guess the bitch threw up in my truck."

Trial 
Martin was indicted by a grand Jury for first degree murder and brought to trial.

Escape Attempts 

Martin and three other inmates on death row attempted an escape but were recaptured before being able to flee the prison grounds.

After being overheard planning another escape which involved taking hostages and ramming a car through the prison's main gate, Martin was moved to the death watch cell near the execution chamber, a month before his execution. This was done for security purposes, as the execution building was situated further back from the main gate than the death row unit.

Execution 
On May 10, 2002, Martin was executed at Louisiana State Penitentiary at Angola by lethal injection. His last meal was boiled crawfish, crawfish stew, a garden salad with Italian dressing, oatmeal cookies and whole milk with chocolate syrup. He did not make a statement before his death.

See also 

 Capital punishment in Louisiana
 Capital punishment in the United States
 List of people executed in Louisiana
 List of people executed in the United States in 2002

General references 
’’State v. Martin’’, 645 So.2d 190 (La. Oct 17, 1994)
http://www.clarkprosecutor.org/html/death/US/martin776.htm

1967 births
2002 deaths
American people executed for murder
American rapists
21st-century executions of American people
21st-century executions by Louisiana
People executed by Louisiana by lethal injection
People convicted of murder by Louisiana